The Actors and Actresses Union Awards is an annual award ceremony organised by the Spanish Actors and Actresses Union, recognising the best performances in Spanish cinema, television and theatre since 1991. It also awards a generic award to the best new actor and actress (in any media) and, since the 28th edition, an award category to the best actor and actress in an international production. The 30th edition, scheduled to take place in 2021, skipped that year and was moved forward to 14 March 2022, expected to be held at the Circo Price.

Editions

Film

Television

Theatre

Newcomer

Performance in an International Production

References 

 
Spanish film awards
Spanish theatre awards
Spanish television awards